FK Beograd, formerly known as White City, is an Australian semi-professional soccer club based in Woodville, Adelaide, South Australia. Founded in 1949 by the Serbian Australian community, the club currently competes in the South Australian National Premier League. FK Beograd was formerly coached by former Australian international Milan Ivanović. They are currently coached by former Adelaide United player Damian Mori, who was appointed as head coach for the 2020 and 2021 season.

History
The Beograd Sports and Social club was formed on 19 November 1949 and a meeting arranged at the railway lawns, North Terrace, Adelaide. The first Committee was: President Ilija Ilic, Vice President Miodrag Zivkovic, Secretary Danilo Cukic, Treasurer Â Nikola Kleut and committee members Dusan Naumovic, Vaso Kekovic, Stanoje Vukovic and Peter Nikolich.

Beograd played its first league game on 15 April 1950 at its home ground in the South Parklands against Prospect, winning the game 5–2. Beograd moved to its current home of Frank Mitchell Park in 1956. In 2006, the Club celebrated its 50th anniversary.

In 1979 Beograd won the State League First Division Championship for the first time. This milestone also coincides with the year Beograd changed its playing colours from blue, white and red to the Serbian colours of Red, blue and white. In addition, flood lights were also installed in 1979 by Branko Petakovic and the president was Milan Stepanovic.

In 1992 Beograd changed its name to White City Woodville. The name of the ground at Woodville West was changed to Frank Mitchell Park in honour of the club's servant who devoted many years of his life to the White City and its juniors.

In 2022 the club changed its name to FK Beograd.

Current squad

Honours

 1st Division/NPL SA Champions: 1979, 1983 & 1993
 1st Division/NPL SA Minor Premiers: 1996
 SA 2nd Division/SA State League One Champions: 1955, 1967, 1971, 1989, 1994 & 2021
 Federation Cup Winners: 1980, 1983, 1993, 1996 & 2005

References

External links
 Official website

Serbian diaspora
Serbian sports clubs in Australia
National Premier Leagues clubs
Soccer clubs in South Australia
Association football clubs established in 1949
1949 establishments in Australia
FK Beograd (Australia)